Elk Mountain is located within the Fraser Valley in South Western British Columbia. It is part of the Cascade mountain range. Its highest point reaches up to 1,432 m. It is often frequented by paragliders.

Hiking Trail 

A popular 4 km (one-way) hiking trail called the Elk-Thurston trail allows access to the summit. This trail gains 640 m of elevation from the trailhead to the summit. The trail continues on to Mount Thurston, 3.5 km further along the trail and another 198 m higher.  The trail continues to Mt Mercer, and it is possible to trek all the way to Mt Cheam.

References

External links 
 Elk Mountain hiking route description

One-thousanders of British Columbia
Canadian Cascades
New Westminster Land District